The 21st Assembly District of Wisconsin is one of 99 districts in the Wisconsin State Assembly. Located in southeastern Wisconsin, the district covers the southeast corner of Milwaukee County, including all of the suburban cities of Oak Creek and South Milwaukee, as well as a few blocks of the neighboring city of Franklin.  The district is represented by Republican Jessie Rodriguez, since winning a special election in November 2013.

The 21st Assembly district is located within Wisconsin's 7th Senate district, along with the 19th and 20th Assembly districts.

History
The district was created in the 1972 redistricting act (1971 Wisc. Act 304) which first established the numbered district system, replacing the previous system which allocated districts to specific counties.  The 21st district was drawn roughly in line with the boundaries of the previous Milwaukee County 24th district (the cities of South Milwaukee and Cudahy).  The 21st district boundaries have remained relatively consistent in redistricting since 1972, with the major exception of the court-ordered 1982 redistricting, which scrambled all State Assembly districts and moved the 21st district to Racine County for the 1983–1984 legislative session.

List of past representatives

References 

Wisconsin State Assembly districts
Milwaukee County, Wisconsin